The Black Point Communications Annex was an antenna array and off-site radio communications annex located in Novato, California, 1.5 miles from Black Point, from which it gained its name. It is located 4 miles north of Hamilton Field, a position that was chosen due to its close proximity to a major air force hub. Due to the property having been privately owned, the federal government had to use eminent domain twice to acquire the land, first in 1939 and again in 1957 in order to expand the array. In 1952, both the Hamilton Air Force Base and the Black Point Communications Annex were declared "Permanent Installations" by the United States Air Force, but their usefulness had already begun to decline, and on January 11, 1976, the General Services Administration (GSA) was placed in charge. Eight years later, they sold the former Black Point Communication Annex to the State of California. Many of the buildings are still intact, such as an electrical power station, 2 transmitting building/control rooms, a generator room, and most of the antennae. Some of the other buildings that were built out of wood or corrugated steel are reduced to foundations. The land on which the array is located is overgrown, and visibly different from the fields and pastures that surround it.

References 

Antennas (radio)